Kwesi Pratt Jnr (born 7 September 1953) is a Ghanaian journalist and managing editor of the Insight Newspaper. Kwesi was a member of Alliance for Change, the organisers of the 1995 Kume Preko anti-government demonstration. He is the founder and owner of Pan African Television network in Ghana.

Politics 
Kwesi Pratt is a Convention People's Party (CPP)  member and has occupied many roles in the party, including his appointment in 2006 as the Publicity committee chairman of the party.

In 2020, he appealed to government to instill fear into the public to reduce the impact of COVID-19 pandemic since the disease was present, killing  people. Kwesi Pratt Jnr continues to put Ghanaian government(s) on their toes, even till date. He recently challenged the wisdom of government giving up Ghana's gold resources to foreign mining companies to exploit and leave Ghana with little to no returns.

References

Living people
1953 births
Convention People's Party (Ghana) politicians
Ghanaian journalists
Managing editors